The 81st parallel north is a circle of latitude that is 81 degrees north of the Earth's equatorial plane, in the Arctic. It crosses the Atlantic Ocean, the Arctic Ocean, Europe, Asia and North America.

At this latitude the sun is always visible during the  summer solstice and astronomical twilight during the winter solstice.

Around the world
Starting at the Prime Meridian and heading eastwards, the parallel 81° north passes through:

{| class="wikitable plainrowheaders"
! scope="col" width="125" | Co-ordinates
! scope="col" | Country, territory or sea
! scope="col" | Notes
|-
| style="background:#b0e0e6;" | 
! scope="row" style="background:#b0e0e6;" | Atlantic Ocean
| style="background:#b0e0e6;" | Greenland Sea
|-valign="top"
| style="background:#b0e0e6;" | 
! scope="row" style="background:#b0e0e6;" | Arctic Ocean
| style="background:#b0e0e6;" |Queen Victoria Sea
|-valign="top"
| 
! scope="row" | 
| Franz Josef Land - Zichy Land
|-
| style="background:#b0e0e6;" | 
! scope="row" style="background:#b0e0e6;" | Arctic Ocean
| style="background:#b0e0e6;" | 
|-
| 
! scope="row" | 
| Franz Josef Land - La Ronciere Island
|-
| style="background:#b0e0e6;" | 
! scope="row" style="background:#b0e0e6;" | Arctic Ocean
| style="background:#b0e0e6;" | 
|-
| 
! scope="row" | 
| Franz Josef Land - Graham Bell Island
|-valign="top"
| style="background:#b0e0e6;" | 
! scope="row" style="background:#b0e0e6;" | Kara Sea
| style="background:#b0e0e6;" | Passing just north of Ushakov Island,  Passing just south of Schmidt Island, Severnaya Zemlya, 
|-
| 
! scope="row" | 
| Severnaya Zemlya - Komsomolets Island
|-
| style="background:#b0e0e6;" | 
! scope="row" style="background:#b0e0e6;" | Arctic Ocean
| style="background:#b0e0e6;" |
|-
| 
! scope="row" | 
| Nunavut - Axel Heiberg Island
|-
| style="background:#b0e0e6;" | 
! scope="row" style="background:#b0e0e6;" | Nansen Sound
| style="background:#b0e0e6;" |
|-
| 
! scope="row" | 
| Nunavut - Ellesmere Island
|-
| style="background:#b0e0e6;" | 
! scope="row" style="background:#b0e0e6;" | Nares Strait
| style="background:#b0e0e6;" |
|-
| 
! scope="row" | 
|Petermann Glacier
|-
| 
! scope="row" | 
|Romer Lake
|-
| style="background:#b0e0e6;" | 
! scope="row" style="background:#b0e0e6;" | Atlantic Ocean
| style="background:#b0e0e6;" | Greenland Sea
|-
|}

See also
80th parallel north
82nd parallel north

n81
Geography of the Arctic